Hoeilaart is a municipality in the province of Flemish Brabant, Belgium. The name Hoeilaart is of Gallic-Celtic origin, coming from "Ho-Lar," meaning a high clearing in the woods. Residents are called Hoeilanders or Doenders.  The municipality only comprises the town of Hoeilaart proper. On January 1, 2019, Hoeilaart had a total population of 11,325. The total area is 20.43 km² which gives a population density of 493 inhabitants per km².  Hoeilaart also sometimes called "The Glass Village" because of the greenhouse grape cultivation that once took place.

The official language is Dutch. Local minorities consist of nationals from many European union-countries, USA and Canada, and numerous French-speakers. 38.1% in 2004 according to the birth statistics of the ONEM agency. 41.6% speak Dutch; the rest speak foreign languages.

Attractions
Forest Museum Jan van Ruusbroec (in the Sonian Forest)
Neo-Romanesque Church dating from 1870–1874
Kasteel de Man (town hall)
"Serristenvillas" from the 1920s
Smeyberghoeve
The old millhouse of the Groenendael Priory

Notable people 
 Jan van Ruusbroec (1291–1381), one of the greatest mystics of the southern Netherlands.
 Armand Pien, weather forecaster on Flemish TV
 Michael Klawans, basketball three-point sharpshooter. Nicknamed White Chocolate.
 Marc Sleen, comics artist, author of Nero
 , lawyer, politician
 Walter Baele

References

External links
 
Official website - Only available in Dutch

 
Municipalities of Flemish Brabant